This list of the military aircraft of the Soviet Union and the Commonwealth of Independent States (CIS) includes experimental, prototypes, and operational types regardless of era. It also includes both native Soviet designs, Soviet-produced copies of foreign designs, and foreign-produced aircraft that served in the military of the Union of Soviet Socialist Republics (USSR) and its successor states of the CIS. The service time frame begins with the year the aircraft entered military service (not the date of first flight, as reported by some sources). Stated production quantities, which are often very approximate, include all variants of the aircraft type produced for the USSR, unless otherwise noted.

Wikipedia convention is to use the Soviet or Russian names and designations for these aircraft, not the post-World War II NATO reporting names, although these will be used as redirects to guide the reader to the desired article. The reporting names assigned by Western intelligence agencies listed here are provided for ease of reference; they are by no means complete. Further details on the NATO Air Standardization Coordinating Committee (ASCC) reporting names can be found here.

Fighters

Attack

Bombers

Reconnaissance

Maritime patrol

Airborne early warning and control

Electronic warfare

Transport and liaison

Tankers

Trainers

Helicopters

Experimental

See also 

 USSR military aircraft designation systems
 List of aircraft
 List of Russian aerospace engineers
 List of currently active Russian military aircraft

External links 
  – Liu.se: online Russian Aviation Museum website + search-engine  – images + descriptions for over 1,300 Soviet−Russian aircraft (Swedish database).
  – AirWar.ru website + database

.
Soviet Union, CIS
L, military aircraft
Aircraft
L, military aircraft
L, military aircraft
L, Soviet
military aircraft, Soviet Union
L, military aircraft, Soviet